Theodore Shulman is an American abortion-rights activist who threatened anti-abortion activists with violence. He proclaimed himself the "first pro-choice terrorist".

Threats and arrest
Shulman had threatened many prominent leaders of the United States anti-abortion movement with physical harm or death, including: Princeton University professor Robert P. George; the National Director of Priests for Life, Fr. Frank Pavone; Operation Rescue advisor, Cheryl Sullenger; and anti-abortion activists Jill Stanek and Gerard Nadal. Shulman made his threats over the phone and Internet throughout the 2000s and early 2010s. In the incidents that led to his arrest and indictment, Shulman made threats in 2009, 2010 and 2011 in a voicemail, in the comments section of the website of the ecumenical and philosophical journal First Things, on the website "PriestsForLife.org" and on the blog "RealChoice." Shulman never explicitly said that he would kill the targets—although he sometimes came very close.

Shulman's threats led to an investigation by the FBI, the New York Police Department Joint Terrorism Task Force, and the United States Department of Justice. Shulman was in the possession of the toxins cyanide, castor beans and rosary peas at the time of his arrest by the FBI in February 2011.

Conviction
Shulman was indicted on six criminal counts in connection with his threats against George and Pavone. As part of a plea bargain, Shulman pleaded guilty to one count of transmitting a threat to injure another person, in that he wrote on the First Things website, "If Roeder is acquitted [of killing Wichita abortion doctor George Tiller], someone will respond by killing [George] of [Princeton University] and [Pavone] of PRIESTS FOR LIFE." 
 
Shulman was sentenced by Federal Judge Paul A. Crotty to 41 months' imprisonment and 3 years' supervised release. As part of the plea deal, Shulman's sentence was at the low end of the sentencing guidelines, and he did not face weapons charges for possession of the cyanide, castor beans and rosary peas.

He was released from prison in October 2014.

References

External links
Press release from the Justice Department

21st-century American criminals
American abortion-rights activists
1961 births
Living people
Terrorism in the United States
Political violence in the United States
Crimes in New York City
American prisoners and detainees
Abortion-rights violence